The New Reality is the third and final  studio album by progressive metal band Operation: Mindcrime. It is the third in a concept album trilogy on virtual currencies, internet banking and stock trading. It was released on December 1, 2017.

Track listing

Personnel
 Geoff Tate - vocals, keyboards, saxophone
 Scott Moughton - lead guitar, keyboards
 Kelly Gray - rhythm guitar, bass
 John Moyer - bass
 Simon Wright - drums
 Scott Mercado - drums
 Brian Tichy - drums
 Mike Ferguson - drums

References

2017 albums
Operation: Mindcrime (band) albums
Frontiers Records albums
Concept albums